is a roman à clef written by Daisaku Ikeda, the third and honorary president of the Soka Gakkai, chronicling the efforts of Jōsei Toda, the second president of the Soka Gakkai, to construct this Buddhist organization upon his release from Sugamo Prison at the end of World War II.  The Human Revolution has sold millions of copies and served as the source of two films of the same name produced by Toho Company and directed by Toshio Masuda.  The novel was printed in 30 volumes.

Ikeda began writing The Human Revolution on December 2, 1964.

The book has been translated into English, French, Portuguese, German, Spanish, Chinese (traditional version), Korean, Italian and Dutch.  The Weatherhill edition of the book has a foreword by Arnold J. Toynbee.

Ikeda followed The Human Revolution with another series of books titled The New Human Revolution.  These volumes began with Ikeda's trip to organize the Soka Gakkai in the United States and Brazil in 1960, several months after he succeeded Toda as president.  The New Human Revolution, completed on August 6, 2018 by Ikeda at the age of 90, consists of 30 volumes.

Selected works
 The Human Revolution (The Human Revolution, #1–12), abridged two-book set, Santa Monica, California: World Tribune Press, 2008; 
 The Human Revolution (The Human Revolution, #1–6 with foreword by Arnold Toynbee), Weatherhill, Inc. edition, publishing years 1972–1999. Vol. 1 (Vol. 2, Vol. 3, Vol. 4, Vol. 5, Vol. 6.
 The New Human Revolution (30 volumes), Santa Monica, California: World Tribune Press, 1995–; partial list: Vol.1, Vol. 2, Vol. 3, Vol. 4, Vol. 5, Vol. 6, Vol. 7, Vol. 8, Vol. 9, Vol. 10, Vol. 11, Vol. 12, Vol. 13, Vol. 14, Vol. 15, Vol. 16, Vol. 17, Vol. 18, Vol. 19, Vol. 20, Vol. 21, Vol. 22, Vol. 23, Vol. 24

Film adaptations
 Ningen Kakumei (The Human Revolution), a 1973 Tōhō production, starring Tetsurō Tamba and directed by Toshio Masuda. It grossed  at the Japanese box office.
 Zoku Ningen Kakumei (The Human Revolution Continues), a 1976 Tōhō production, starring Tetsurō Tamba and directed by Toshio Masuda. It grossed  at the Japanese box office.

References

External links 
 
 

Roman à clef novels
Soka Gakkai